Robert Nesta Morgan (born 13 November 1981) is a Jamaican politician. He is currently a Minister without Portfolio in the Office of the Prime Minister with responsibility for Information. He  is a member of the governing Jamaica Labour Party. Morgan represents Clarendon North Central.

References
https://jamaica.loopnews.com/content/holness-announces-cabinet-changes-and-other-appointments

External links
 

Living people
1981 births
Jamaica Labour Party politicians
People from Clarendon Parish, Jamaica
Members of the 14th Parliament of Jamaica
Government ministers of Jamaica